is a Japanese manga series created by Makoto Kobayashi. In 1984, it began its serialization in the Weekly Morning magazine. The manga shows Michael, an orange American Shorthair tabby cat, his feline friends, and other domesticated pets in a series of humorous episodes. Michael is not a specific cat, but rather a feline version of the everyman as he appeared in drastically different settings across chapters: he's a normal cat in some chapters (with different owners in different chapters), an anthropomorphic cat in others, and he even dies in some chapters.

Dark Horse Comics released the series in the US as eleven volumes between 1997 and 2006, and in 2020 released the first volume of a "Fatcat Collection", which spanned the first six volumes. The manga was presented in the standard left to right American reading format.

In 1986, What's Michael? received the Kodansha Manga Award for general manga.

The manga was adapted into two anime OVA films in 1985 and 1988, and a 45-episode TV series in 1988–1989.

Story 
Most episodes of the series fall into one of two kinds of stories. The first portrays the cats in a realistic way, living out normal lives with their owners. It finds humor in how humans observe their pets' naturally quirky behavior. The second type of story is complete fantasy in which all the animals are given anthropomorphic characteristics such as walking on two legs, wearing clothes, and being able to talk to each other; these episodes place the animals in a storyline that mixes up their human personae with normal animal behavior.

Chapters

See also

References

External links 
 
 "Translated Manga Pick of the Month"—J-pop.com
 What's Michael? vol. 1 review—Ex.org

1984 manga
1985 anime OVAs
1988 anime OVAs
1988 anime television series debuts
Animated television series about cats
Comics about cats
Dark Horse Comics titles
Kodansha manga
Seinen manga
TV Tokyo original programming
Winner of Kodansha Manga Award (General)